Ilse Schmidt (11 September 1892 in Schwerin - 12 September 1964 in Heilbronn) was a German politician (German state party and CDU). In 1922, she became director of the Social Women's School in Rostock, 1929 full-time lecturer in political science, law and welfare and economics and social policy at the Women's School for Volunteers in Frankfurt am Main. As a speaker for women's issues in the CDU state party, she developed after a busy women's political commitment: including in the DFD, in the Social and Input Committee of the Schwerin Landtag, in the Legal Commission of the Central Women's Committee of the German Central Administration for Education.

References

Literature 
 Klaus Schwabe: Landtagswahl in Mecklenburg-Vorpommern 1946. Begleitheft zur Ausstellung im Landtag Mecklenburg-Vorpommern vom 28. August bis 20. Oktober 1996, Schwerin 1996

1892 births
1964 deaths
People from Schwerin
German women lawyers
20th-century German lawyers
20th-century German women politicians
20th-century women lawyers